The Guyana women's national rugby union team represents Guyana in the sport of rugby union.

History
The team were three-time NACRA 7s champions in consecutive years from 2008, but dwindled due to lack of funding. The 2016 Olympics renewed interest in building the team.

Results summary
(Full internationals only)

Results

Full internationals

See also
 Rugby union in Guyana
Guyana women's national football team

References

External links
 Guyana on IRB.com
 Guyana on RugbyData.com

Caribbean women's national rugby union teams
Rugby union in Guyana
Rugby union